Friedrich Wilhelm Ludwig Schubart (21 October 1873 – 9 August 1960) was a German ancient historian. He was leading authority in the field of papyrology.

Shubart was born on 21 October 1873 in Liegnitz, then part of the German Empire. He studied classical philology and philosophy at the Universities of Tübingen, Halle, Berlin and Breslau, earning his PhD at the latter institution in 1897. In 1900 he obtained his habilitation in ancient history at Berlin, becoming an associate professor in 1912. From 1931 to 1937 he was an honorary professor in Berlin, later serving as a professor of ancient history at the University of Leipzig (1948–52).

From 1901 to 1912 he worked as an assistant director at the Royal Museum in Berlin. Afterwards, he served as curator and director of the Papyrussammlung (Papyrus collections) in Berlin (1912–1937).

On 17 December 1928, he married Gertrud Schubart-Fikentscher, who later became a professor of law at the University of Halle. Shubart died in Halle on 9 August 1960.

Selected works 
 Das Buch bei den Griechen und Römern, 1907 – The book of Greeks and Romans.
 Elephantine-Papyri (with Otto Rubensohn and Wilhelm Spiegelberg), 1907 – Elephantine papyri.
 Papyri graecae berolinenses, 1911 – Greek papyri in Berlin [collections].
 Einführung in die papyruskunde, 1918 – Introduction to papyrus studies.
 Papyri und Ostraka der Ptolemäerzeit, 1922 – Papyri and ostracon of the Ptolemaic Era.
 Palaeographie, 1925 – Palaeography.
 Justinian und Theodora, 1936 – Justinian and Theodora.

References

External links 
 Profile from the Saxon Academy of Sciences and Humanities

1873 births
1960 deaths
People from Legnica
Academic staff of the Humboldt University of Berlin
Academic staff of Leipzig University
20th-century German historians
German papyrologists
German male non-fiction writers
Members of the German Academy of Sciences at Berlin
Corresponding Fellows of the British Academy